Raúl Andrés Ríos de Choudens (born 3 December 1993 in Guaynabo, Puerto Rico), is a world class sailor in the Optimist, Snipe, and Lightning classes.

He began sailing Optimists at the age of ten at the Club Náutico de San Juan, and became North American champion and World champion in 2008.

From the Optimist class, he moved into the 420, Snipe and Lightning classes. He started sailing in the Snipe Class by crewing for Ernesto Rodriguez just after summer of 2008, training for the Western Hemisphere's championship in Uruguay that November where they finished third overall. He then took the skipper position, with Fernando Monllor from the Club Náutico de Ponce as a crew, competing in the US Nationals, the North Americans, the Western Hemisphere and Oriental Championship, the Pan American Games and the Central American and Caribbean Games.

He won the following regattas:
 United States National Championship (2013, 2014, 2015)
 North American Championship (2011, 2012, 2015, 2022)
 Western Hemisphere & Orient Championship (2014)

In 2017, he won another world championship, the Snipe class Worlds, with Max Agnese as his crew, in Corunna, the bronze medal at the Lightning Southamericans, and World Championship at Salinas Yacht Club, with Sebastian Higuera and Nicolas Deeb.

Pan American Games
 4th place in Snipe at Guadalajara 2011.
 1st place in Snipe at Toronto 2015.

Central American and Caribbean Games
 1st place in Snipe at Mayagüez 2010.
 1st place in Snipe at Veracruz 2014.
 1st place in Snipe at Barranquilla 2018.

College
Ríos sailed for Boston College, where he earned ICSA Coed All-American Honors, earned first team All-NEISA Skipper Honors, and was named an All-America Skipper in May 2013.

He earned the 2015-16 Eagle of the Year Award, and was one of the three finalists for the prestigious College Sailor of the Year award. Raul served as Team Captain and encouraged his team to engage in community service projects and high academic success.

References

External links
 

1993 births
Boston College Eagles sailors
Living people
Optimist class world champions
People from Guaynabo, Puerto Rico
Puerto Rican male sailors (sport)
Pan American Games gold medalists for Puerto Rico
Sailors at the 2011 Pan American Games
Sailors at the 2015 Pan American Games
Snipe class sailors
Snipe class world champions
Pan American Games medalists in sailing
World champions in sailing for Puerto Rico
Central American and Caribbean Games gold medalists for Puerto Rico
Competitors at the 2010 Central American and Caribbean Games
Competitors at the 2014 Central American and Caribbean Games
Central American and Caribbean Games medalists in sailing
Medalists at the 2015 Pan American Games